The List of shipwrecks in 1792 includes ships sunk, foundered, wrecked, grounded or otherwise lost during 1792.

January

21 January

22 January

23 January

Unknown date

February

18 February

25 February

Unknown date

March

6 March

17 March

Unknown date

April

5 April

Unknown date

May

2 May

Unknown date

June

20 June

Unknown date

July

14 July

Unknown date

August

1 August

20 August

23 August

Unknown date

September

19 September

21 September

Unknown date

October

7 October

12 October

30 October

Unknown date

November

10 November

15 November

22 November

23 November

Unknown date

December

1 December

3 December

4 December

10 December

17 December

19 December

22 December

Unknown date

Unknown date

References

1792